The Cynthia Peninsula is a peninsula in Northeastern Ontario, Canada, situated at the northern end of Lake Temagami. It has a north–south trend surrounded by two portions of Lake Temagami; Ferguson Bay to the east and the North Arm to the west. To its north it is connected to the mainland.

The Cynthia Peninsula is the namesake of Cynthia Township, a geographic township that includes the Cynthia Peninsula.

See also
McLean Peninsula
Joan Peninsula

References

Peninsulas of Ontario
Landforms of Temagami
Landforms of Nipissing District